The Daytime Emmy Award for Outstanding Talk Show Entertainment was an award presented annually by the National Academy of Television Arts and Sciences (NATAS) and Academy of Television Arts & Sciences (ATAS). The award was given in honor of a talk show that was in the entertainment nature. It was awarded from the 35th Daytime Emmy Awards ceremony, held in 2008, to the 49th Daytime Emmy Awards ceremony, held in 2022. During this period, the generic Outstanding Talk Show category was split into two specific categories: this award and Outstanding Talk Show Informative. In 2023, the NATAS will merge the two specific categories back into one.

The Ellen DeGeneres Show held the record for the most awards in this specific entertainment talk show category, winning on seven occasions, and the most nominations, with a total of eleven.

Winners and nominees
Listed below are the winners of the award for each year, as well as the other nominees.

Multiple wins/nominations

References

External links
 Daytime Emmy Awards at the Internet Movie Database

Talk Show Entertainment
Awards established in 2008
Awards disestablished in 2022